Rasbora cephalotaenia is a species of ray-finned fish in the genus Rasbora. It is found on the Malay Peninsula and Indonesia.

References

Fish of Singapore
Fish of Malaysia
Taxa named by Pieter Bleeker
Fish described in 1852
Freshwater fish of Indonesia
Rasboras